Edgar Givry (born 9 August 1953) is a French actor. He appeared in more than seventy films since 1974. He is also the official French dub of John Malkovich and Kermit the Frog in The Muppets.

Filmography

References

External links
 

1953 births
Living people
People from Saint-Raphaël, Var
French male film actors
French male television actors
20th-century French male actors
21st-century French male actors